Charles Craven was a colonial governor of South Carolina.

Charles Craven may also refer to:
 Charles H. Craven (1843–1898), U.S. Navy officer
 Charlie Craven (1909–1972), English footballer
 Sir Charles Craven, 1st Baronet (1884–1944), of the Craven baronets